Mentaxya is a genus of moths of the family Noctuidae.

Epizootic and parasitic fungus Batkoa apiculata has been found on moth, Mentaxya muscosa in Africa.

Species
Some species of this genus are:

Mentaxya albifrons 	(Geyer, 1837)
Mentaxya arabica 	Wiltshire, 1980	
Mentaxya atritegulata 	(Hampson, 1902)
Mentaxya basilewskyi 	(Berio, 1955)
Mentaxya bergeri 	(Berio, 1955)
Mentaxya bruneli 	Laporte, 1975
Mentaxya camerunensis 	Laporte, 1973 
Mentaxya comorana 	Viette, 1960 
Mentaxya cumulata 	(Walker, 1865)
Mentaxya dallolmoi 	Berio, 1972
Mentaxya fletcheri 	(Berio, 1955)
Mentaxya fouqueae 	Laporte, 1974
Mentaxya grisea 	Laporte, 1973 
Mentaxya ignicollis 	(Walker, 1857)
Mentaxya ikondae 	Berio, 1972
Mentaxya inconstans 	Laporte, 1984 
Mentaxya indigna 	(Herrich-Schäffer, 1854
Mentaxya lacteifrons 	Laporte, 1984
Mentaxya leroyi 	(Berio, 1955)
Mentaxya minor 	Berio, 1977
Mentaxya muscosa 	Geyer, 1837
Mentaxya nigromaculata Laporte, 1984
Mentaxya nimba 	Laporte, 1972
Mentaxya palmistarum 	(de Joannis, 1932)
Mentaxya percurvata 	(Berio, 1955)
Mentaxya pujoli 	Laporte, 1973
Mentaxya pyroides 	Berio, 1972
Mentaxya quadrata 	Berio, 1974
Mentaxya reninigra 	Laporte, 1977
Mentaxya rimosa 	(Guenée, 1852)
Mentaxya sandrae 	Laporte, 1974
Mentaxya sexalata 	Viette, 1958
Mentaxya strictirena 	Berio, 1974
Mentaxya suffusalis 	Laporte, 1973
Mentaxya thomasi 	Laporte, 1984
Mentaxya torrianii 	Laporte, 1977
Mentaxya trisellata 	Viette, 1958
Mentaxya trisellatoides 	Laporte, 1973
Mentaxya vuattouxi 	Laporte, 1972

References

Noctuinae